{{DISPLAYTITLE:Upsilon2 Centauri}}

Upsilon2 Centauri (υ2 Centauri) is a binary star system in the southern constellation Centaurus. It is visible to the naked eye with an apparent visual magnitude of +4.33. Based upon an annual parallax shift of just 2.57 mas as seen from Earth, this star is located roughly 1,300 light years from the Sun.

This is a single-lined spectroscopic binary star system with an orbital period of 207.357 days and an eccentricity of 0.55. The primary component has the spectrum of an evolved F-type giant/bright giant hybrid with a stellar classification of F7 II/III. It is around 46 million years old with 6.9 times the mass of the Sun. The star is radiating 3,919 times the Sun's luminosity from its photosphere at an effective temperature of 6,495 K.

References

F-type bright giants
Runaway stars
Centauri, Upsilon2
Centaurus (constellation)
Durchmusterung objects
122223
068523
5260
Spectroscopic binaries